Eremurus himalaicus, the Himalayan foxtail lily or white-flowered foxtail lily, is a species of flowering plant in the family Asphodelaceae. It is native to Afghanistan, Pakistan, and the western Himalayas.

References

Asphodeloideae
Bulbous plants
Garden plants of Asia
Flora of Afghanistan
Flora of Pakistan
Flora of West Himalaya
Plants described in 1876